The 2005 Atlantic Indoor Football League season was the league's first overall season.  The league champions were the Richmond Bandits, who defeated the Erie Freeze in American Bowl I.

Standings

 Green indicates clinched playoff berth
 Black indicates best regular season record

Playoffs

External links
 2005 AIFL Standings
 2005 AIFL Schedule
 2005 AIFL Playoffs

American Indoor Football Association seasons
2005 in American football